Matthew Clarke (born 29 April 1995) in Melbourne, Australia is an Australian Olympic athlete who competes in the 3000 metres steeplechase.

Early years 
Clarke enjoyed long distance running as a child but gave it up in year 8. After finishing school at the age of 19 he found the motivation to return. By the time he was 20 he was running around 3:49 (1500m) and 8:32 (3000m) whilst still studying Podiatry at La Trobe University. Three years later he ran 3:44 over 1500m when he came ninth at the Gold Coast Commonwealth Games trials. In June 2018, Clarke travelled to the US as a guide for Paralympian Jaryd Clifford. He raced as well and clocked a PB in the 1500m at Portland.

Clarke works as a Sports Podiatrist at the Sports and Arthritic clinic (SPARC) in Mile End, SA. He is coached by Adam Didyk as a member of ASICS Team Tempo elite. Clarke lives with his fiancé Annabel Kitto who is also a 1500m track runner. Clarke studied Podiatry at La Trobe University.

Achievements 
At the age of 23 Clarke competing in a new event, the steeplechase.He ran 8:58 in January, 2019 and 8:38.68 on his second attempt in February. He was placed fifth at nationals and earned selection in the Australian team for the World University Games. Clarke came tenth in the final. He then clocked 28:39.02 for the 10,000m at Zatopek, Melbourne. (Named after Emil Zatopek, the Czech long-distance runner, it is the most prestigious track race in Australia). 

On June 18 2021 in Townsville Clarke ran a new personal best in the 3000 metres steeplechase of 8:22.62, the second fastest time ran by an Australian, in Australia and 10 seconds faster than his previous best. 7 days later, Clarke backed up to run another 3000m steeplechase on the Gold Coast in a time of 8:22.13  With that personal best it also placed him as the fifth all time Australian for the 3000m steeplechase.

Clarke qualified for the Tokyo 2020 Olympics where he competed in the Men's 3000m steeplechase. He ran fourteenth in his heat with a time of 8:42.37 and did not qualify for the final.

References

1995 births
Living people
La Trobe University alumni
Athletes (track and field) at the 2020 Summer Olympics
Australian male steeplechase runners
Olympic athletes of Australia